Dying is the final stage of life which will eventually lead to death. Diagnosing dying is a complex process of clinical decision-making, and most practice checklists facilitating this diagnosis are based on cancer diagnoses.

Signs of dying 

The National Cancer Institute in the United States advises that the presence of some of the following signs may indicate that death is approaching:

 Drowsiness, increased sleep, and/or unresponsiveness (caused by changes in the patient's metabolism).
 Confusion about time, place, and/or identity of loved ones; restlessness; visions of people and places that are not present; pulling at bed linens or clothing (caused in part by changes in the patient's metabolism).
 Decreased socialization and withdrawal (caused by decreased oxygen to the brain, decreased blood flow, and mental preparation for dying).
 Decreased need for food and fluids, and loss of appetite (caused by the body's need to conserve energy and its decreasing ability to use food and fluids properly).
 Loss of bladder or bowel control (caused by the relaxing of muscles in the pelvic area).
 Darkened urine or decreased amount of urine (caused by slowing of kidney function and/or decreased fluid intake).
 Skin becoming cool to the touch, particularly the hands and feet; skin may become bluish in color, especially on the underside of the body (caused by decreased circulation to the extremities).
 Rattling or gurgling sounds while breathing, which may be loud (death rattle); breathing that is irregular and shallow; decreased number of breaths per minute; breathing that alternates between rapid and slow (caused by congestion from decreased fluid consumption, a buildup of waste products in the body, and/or a decrease in circulation to the organs).
 Turning of the head toward a light source (caused by decreasing vision).
 Increased difficulty controlling pain (caused by progression of the disease).
 Involuntary movements (called myoclonus), increased heart rate, hypertension followed by hypotension, and loss of reflexes in the legs and arms are additional signs that the end of life is near.

Cultural perspectives on dying 
How humans understand and approach the process dying differs across cultures. In some cultures, death is the complete termination of life. In other cultures, death can include altered states of being, like sleep or illness. In some traditions, death marks the transition into a different kind of existence, or involves a cyclic pattern of death and rebirth. These cultural differences affect people's lifestyles, behaviors, and approach to death and dying.

United States 
In the United States, a pervasive "death-defying" culture leads to resistance against the process of dying. Death and illness are often conceived as things to "fight against", with conversations about death and dying considered morbid or taboo. Most people die in a hospital or nursing facility, with only around 30% dying at home. As the United States is a culturally diverse nation, attitudes towards death and dying vary according to cultural and spiritual factors.

China 
In Chinese culture, death is viewed as the end of life — there is no afterlife — resulting in negative perceptions of dying. These attitudes towards death and dying originate from the three dominant religions in China: Taoism, Buddhism, and Confucianism.

South Pacific 
In some cultures of the South Pacific, life is believed to leave a person's body when they are sick or asleep, making for multiple "deaths" in the span of one lifetime.

Religious perspectives on dying

Christianity 
In Christian belief, most agree that believers will only experience death once; however, various traditions hold different beliefs about what happens during the intermediate state, the period between death and the universal resurrection. For many traditions, death is the separation of body and soul, so the soul continues to exist in a disembodied state. Other traditions believe that the soul and body are inseparable, meaning that the body's death renders the soul unconscious until the resurrection. Others believe that the spirit leaves the body to exist in heaven or hell.

Islam 
In Islamic belief, the time of death is predetermined, with dying therefore perceived as the will of Allah. Dying is therefore considered as something to be accepted, with Muslims regularly encouraged to reflect upon death and dying. The majority of Muslims prefer to die at home, surrounded by their loved ones, with large numbers expected at the bedside of those who are dying.

Hinduism 
In Hinduism, people are believed to die and be reborn with a new identity.

Buddhism 
In Chinese Buddhism, it is said that dying patients will experience phases between the state of torment and the state of exultation, and that caretaker must help the dying patient remain in the state of exultation through Nianfo prayers. In some parts of Buddhism, the dead and living exist together, with the former having power and influence over the lives of the latter.

Medicalization

Resuscitation 
Resuscitation is the act of reviving of someone and is performed when someone is unconscious or dying. Resuscitation is performed using a variety of techniques, of those the most common is Cardio Pulmonary Resuscitation (CPR). CPR is a procedure consisting of cycles of chest compressions and ventilation support with the goal of maintaining blood flow and oxygen to the vital organs of the body. Defibrillation, or shock, is also provided following CPR in an attempt to jump start the heart. Emergency Medical Services (EMS) are often the first to administer CPR to patients outside of the hospital. Although EMS is not able to pronounce death, they are asked to determine the presence of clear signs of death and gauge whether CPR should be attempted or not. CPR is not indicated if the provider is at risk of harm or injury while attempting CPR, if clear signs of death are present (rigor mortis, dependent lividity, decapitation, transection, decomposition, etc.), or if the patient is exempt from resuscitation. Exemption is typically the case when the patient has an advanced directive, a Physician Orders for Life-Sustaining Treatment (POLST) form indicating that resuscitation is not desired, or a valid Do Not Attempt Resuscitation (DNAR) order.

End-of-life care 
End-of-life care is oriented towards a natural stage in the process of living, unlike other conditions. The National Hospice and Palliative Care Organization (NHPCO) states that hospice care or end-of-life care begins when curative treatments are no longer possible, and a person is diagnosed with a terminal illness with less than six months to live. Hospice care involves palliative care aimed at providing at comfort for patients and support for loved ones. This process integrates medical care, pain management, as well as social and emotional support provided by social workers and other members of the healthcare team including family physicians, nurses, counselors, trained volunteers, and home health aides. Hospice care is associated with enhanced symptom relief, facilitates achievement of end-of-life wishes, and results in higher quality of end-of-life care compared with standard care involving extensive hospitalization.

Psychological adjustment processes 
When a person realizes that their life is threatened by a fatal illness, they come to terms with it and with their approaching end. This confrontation has been described in diaries, autobiographies, medical reports, novels, and also in poetry. Since the middle of the 20th century, the "fight" against death has been researched in the social sciences on the basis of empirical data and field studies field research. The developed theories and models are intended to serve helpers in the accompaniment of terminally ill people above anything else.

The theories of dying describe psychosocial aspects of dying as well as models for the dying process. Particularly highlighted psychosocial aspects are: Total Pain (C. Saunders), Acceptance (J. M. Hinton, Kübler-Ross), Awareness/Insecurity (B.Glaser, A.Strauß), Response to Challenges (E.S.Shneidman), Appropriateness (A. D. Weisman), Autonomy (H.Müller-Busch), Fear (R. Kastenbaum, G.D.Borasio) and Ambivalence (E. Engelke).

Phase and stage models
There have been many phase and stage models for the course of dying developed from a psychological and psychosocial perspective. A distinction is made between three and twelve phases that a dying person goes through.

A more recently developed and revised phase model is the Illness Constellation Model, first published in 1991. The phases are associated with shock, dizziness, and uncertainty at the first symptoms and diagnosis; changing emotional states and thoughts, efforts to maintain control over one's own life; withdrawal, grief over lost abilities, and suffering from the imminent loss of one's own existence; finally psycho-physical decline.

The best known is the Five stages of Grief Model developed by Elisabeth Kübler-Ross, a Swiss-US psychiatrist. In her work, Kübler-Ross compiled various preexisting findings of Thanatology published by John Hinton, Cicely Saunders, Barney G. Glaser and Anselm L. Strauss and others. Because of this, she brought the public's attention to it more than it previously received, which has continued to this day. She focused on the treatment of the dying, with grief and mourning, as well as with studies on death and near-death experiences. The five stages in this model this model are the following: Denial and Isolation, Anger, Bargaining, Depression, and Consent. According to Kübler-Ross, hope is almost always present in each of the five phases, suggesting that the patients never completely give up and that hope must not be taken away from them. Loss of hope is soon followed by death, and the fear of death can only be overcome by everyone starting with themselves and accepting their own death, according to Kübler-Ross.
From Kübler-Ross's research, psychiatrists have set new impulses for dealing with dying and grieving people. Her key message was that the people aiding must first clarify their own fears and life problems ("unfinished business") as far as possible and accept their own death before they can turn to the dying in a helpful way. 
The five phases of dying were extracted by Kübler-Ross from interviews of terminally ill people describing psychological adjustment processes in the dying process. The five phases are widely referred to, although Kübler-Ross herself critically questions the validity of her phase model several times. Some of her self-critiques include the following: The phases are not experienced in a fixed order one after the other, but they can alternate or repeat; some phases may not be experienced at all; a final acceptance of one's own dying may not take place in every case. In end-of-life care, space is given to psychological conflict, but coping with the phases can rarely be influenced from the outside.

In international research on dying, there are a number of scientifically based objections to the phase model and to models that describe dying in terms of staged behaviors in general. Above all, the naïve use of the phase model is viewed critically and even in specialist books, hope–a central aspect of the phase model for Kübler-Ross–is not mentioned.

Influencing factors
The scientifically based criticism of phase models has led to forgoing defying the dying process in stages, and instead to elaborating on factors that influence the course of dying. 
Based on research findings from several sciences, Robert J. Kastenbaum says, "Individuality and universality combine in dying."
In Kastenbaum's model, individual and societal attitudes influence our dying and how we deal with knowledge about dying and death. Influencing factors are age, gender, interpersonal relationships, the type of illness, the environment in which treatment takes place, religion, and culture. This model is the personal reality of the dying person, where fear, refusal, and acceptance form the core of the dying person's confrontation with death.

Ernst Engelke took up Kastenbaum's approach and developed it further with the thesis, "Just as each person's life is unique, so is their death unique. Nevertheless, there are similarities in the death of all people. According to this, all terminally ill people have in common that they are confronted with realizations, responsibilities, and constraints that are typical of dying." For example, a characteristic realization is that the illness is threatening their life. Typical constraints result from the disease, therapies, and side effects. In Engelke's model, the personal and unique aspects of death result from the interaction of many factors in coping with the realizations, responsibilities, and constraints. Important factors include the following: the genetic make-up, personality, life experience, physical, psychological, social, financial, religious, and spiritual resources; the type, degree, and duration of the disease, the consequences and side effects of treatment, the quality of medical treatment and care, the material surroundings (i.e. furnishings of the apartment, clinic, home); and the expectations, norms, and behavior of relatives, carers, doctors and the public. According to Engelke, the complexity of dying and the uniqueness of each dying person creates guidelines for communication with dying people.

Awareness 
Along with medical professionals and relatives, sociologists and psychologists also engage in the question of if it is ethical to inform terminally ill patients of the infaust prognosis, or the uncertain diagnosis. In 1965, the sociologists Barney G. Glaser and Anselm Strauss published the results of empirical studies where they derived four different types of Awareness of dying patients: Closed Awareness, Suspected Awareness, Mutual Pretense Awareness, and Open Awareness. In Closed Awareness, only relatives, caregivers, and medical professionals recognize the patient's condition; the patient themselves does not recognize his dying. In Suspected Awareness, the patient suspects what those around him know, but they are not told by relatives of medical professionals. In Mutual Pretense Awareness, all participants know about that the person is dying, but they behave as if they did not know. In Open Awareness, all participants behave according to their knowledge.

The Hospice Movement in the United Kingdom in particular has since advocated for open, truthful and trustful interaction. The situation does not become easier for all involved if difficult conversations are avoided; rather it intensifies and possibly leads to a disturbed relationship of trust between people, which makes further treatment more difficult or impossible.

See also 

 Assisted dying (disambiguation)
 Assisted suicide
 End-of-life care
 Euthanasia
 Last rites
 Near-death experience
 Right to die
 Terminal illness
 Voluntary euthanasia

References 

Human life stages
Death
Biology
Signs of death
Medical aspects of death